Fool's Gold Loaf is a sandwich made by the Colorado Mine Company, a restaurant in Denver, Colorado. It consists of a single warmed, hollowed-out loaf of bread filled with the contents of one jar of creamy peanut butter, one jar of grape jelly, and a pound of bacon.

The sandwich's connection to the singer Elvis Presley is the source of its legend and prolonged interest. According to The Life and Cuisine of Elvis Presley, Presley and his friends took his private jet from Graceland, purchased 30 of the sandwiches, and spent two hours eating them and drinking Perrier and champagne before flying home. The story became legend and the sandwich became the subject of continued media interest and part of numerous cookbooks, typically focused on Presley's love of food.

Origin 
There are two accounts on the origin of Fool's Gold Loaf. According to Graeme Wood, it was created by Cindy and Buck Scott, owners of the Colorado Mine Company restaurant. Wood writes that Presley obtained the recipe from the Scotts so his personal chef could make it, but noted that "the Fool's Gold Loaf never made a recorded encore".

According to Nick Andurlakis, he helped create the sandwich while he was a chef at the Colorado Mine Company and suggested the dish to Presley. Andurlakis said that he personally delivered the sandwiches to Presley on the famous night.

The sandwich was named to fit the restaurant's  mining motif. At the time of Presley's famous outing, it cost $49.95.

Preparation 
The recipe has been repeated by numerous sources, including The Life and Cuisine of Elvis Presley and Andurlakis, a chef at the Colorado Mine Company.

The Fool's Gold Loaf begins with a loaf of French white bread that is covered in two tablespoons of margarine and baked in the oven at  until brown. One pound of sliced bacon is fried in oil until crispy and drained. The loaf is sliced lengthwise, hollowed out, and filled with peanut butter, grape jelly and bacon.

According to Andurlakis, he personally served Presley the Fool's Gold Loaf with bacon, peanut butter, and blueberry preserves on a loaf of French bread. The specific type of preserves was allegedly Dickinson's blueberry preserves.

Elvis Presley connection 
David Adler's book contains a detailed account of the event that made the Fool's Gold Loaf sandwich famous. On the night of February 1, 1976, Elvis Presley was at his home at Graceland in Memphis, entertaining Captain Jerry Kennedy of the Denver Police Department, and Ron Pietrafeso of Colorado's Strike Force Against Crime. The three men began discussing the sandwich, and Presley decided he wanted one right then. Presley had been to the restaurant before, while in Denver.

Kennedy and Pietrafeso were friends of the owners, so they were driven to the Memphis airport and boarded Presley's private Convair 880 jet, the Lisa Marie, and flew the two hours to Denver. When they arrived at Stapleton International Airport at 1:40 AM, the plane taxied to a special hangar where the passengers were greeted by Buck Scott, the owner of the Colorado Mine Company, and his wife Cindy, who had brought 22 fresh Fool's Gold Loaves for the men. They spent two hours in the hangar eating the sandwiches, washing them down with Perrier and champagne. Presley invited the pilots of the plane, Milo High and Elwood Davis, to join them. When they were done, they flew back to Memphis without ever leaving the Denver airport.

Coverage 

The Fool's Gold Loaf connection to Elvis Presley dominates the media's coverage of the subject. It was widely reported as "legend" by the media; including the NBC's Today, The Joplin Globe, and the Gloucester Daily Times. The popular legend and sandwich were also noted by the Smithsonian.

The recipe has been included in numerous publications and cookbooks, including David Alder's book The Life and Cuisine of Elvis Presley. Alder's work continued with the television documentary The Burger and The King. Another publication by Alder, Eating the Elvis Presley Way, was later released.

The Fool's Gold Loaf has been detailed in Ramble Colorado: The Wanderer's Guide to the Offbeat, Overlooked, and Outrageous. The Peanut Butter and Co. Cookbook refers to the Fool's Gold Loaf legend and ties it to the peanut butter, banana and bacon sandwich, also known as the "Elvis sandwich".

In addition, the sandwich and its connection to Presley is featured in the 2013 romantic comedy The F Word (What If), with The Last Leg showing it off as well, in order to promote the film.

A Fool's Gold Loaf was one of the ingredients used in the 2018 "Grill Masters: Memphis" episode of Chopped.

A 3-pound version of the Fool's Gold Loaf, known as the "Elvis Challenge", was prepared by Kansas City, Missouri restaurant Succotash during a 2019 episode of the Cooking Channel's Man v. Food.

See also

 List of bacon dishes
 List of sandwiches
 List of peanut dishes
 Peanut butter and jelly sandwich
Peanut butter, banana and bacon sandwich, another sandwich Elvis Presley enjoyed

References

External links
Video report about preparation of Fool's Gold Loaf, The Spokesman-Review, 16 August 2007
Elvis Flew Across the Country to Eat a Sandwich Video about the sandwich and its connection to Elvis Presley, Fact Fiend, 29 June 2018

American sandwiches
Bacon sandwiches
Cuisine of the Western United States
Culture of Denver
Elvis Presley
Peanut butter sandwiches